Air Marshal Sir John Robert Walker,  (born 26 May 1936) is a former Royal Air Force officer who served as Chief of Defence Intelligence from 1991 to 1994.

RAF career
Walker joined the Royal Air Force in 1954 and was commissioned on 31 July 1956. He served as a pilot with No. 66 Squadron flying Hunters from 1957 until he joined No.4 Squadron also flying Hunters in 1959. After attending the RAF Staff College, Bracknell in 1966, he served as an exchange officer with the Twelfth Air Force, a formation of the United States Air Force, from 1967 to 1969. He became officer commanding the Jaguar Conversion Team at RAF Lossiemouth in June 1973, station commander at RAF Lossiemouth in August 1975 and station commander at RAF Bruggen in 1976. He went on to be Group Captain, Offensive Operations at Headquarters RAF Germany in January 1978, Air Officer-in-Chief, Central Tactics and Trials Organisation in December 1979 and, after attending the Royal College of Defence Studies, Director of Forward Policy (RAF) at the Ministry of Defence in December 1982. After that he became Senior Air Staff Officer at RAF Strike Command in May 1985, Deputy Chief of Staff (Operations) at Headquarters Allied Air Forces Central Europe in April 1987 and Director-General Management & Support Intelligence at the Ministry of Defence 1989. His last appointment was as Chief of Defence Intelligence in 1991 before retirement in January 1995.

References

1936 births
Living people
Knights Commander of the Order of the Bath
Commanders of the Order of the British Empire
Recipients of the Air Force Cross (United Kingdom)
Royal Air Force air marshals
Recipients of the Commendation for Valuable Service in the Air